"Anti-Hero" is a song by American singer-songwriter Taylor Swift and the lead single from her tenth studio album, Midnights (2022). Written and produced by Swift and Jack Antonoff, "Anti-Hero" is a pop rock and synth-pop song driven by looped drums and retro synthesizers. The lyrics discuss self-loathing, depression and anxiety, inspired by Swift's nightmares and issues with depersonalization and self-hatred, critiquing the societal pressures and her shortcomings. Made available for digital download on October 21, 2022, the song was first serviced to US radio on October 24 by Republic Records.

Music critics praised the song for its direct lyricism, catchy rhythm, synth-based instrumentation, and vocal tones, with Billboard ranking it as the best song on Midnights; some publications also dubbed it the best lead single of Swift's career. Year-end lists from publications named "Anti-Hero" as one of the best songs of 2022. An accompanying music video for the song, written and directed by Swift, premiered on October 21 as well. It depicts Swift's fears, insecurities, and eating disorder, using three different incarnations of her. The video also reenacts one of her nightmares about her legacy and last will, casting Mike Birbiglia, John Early, and Mary Elizabeth Ellis as Swift's fictional sons and daughter-in-law, respectively.

"Anti-Hero" broke the global and US records for the biggest opening-day streams for a song in Spotify history. It reached the top 10 of the official charts in 40 territories, including number-one peaks in Australia, Belgium, Canada, Croatia, Indonesia, Ireland, Israel, Latvia, Malaysia, New Zealand, the Philippines, Portugal, Singapore, the United Kingdom, and the United States, in several of which it spent multiple weeks at number one—Swift's longest-running number-one song in the UK and the US. The single marked Swift's ninth chart-topper on the Billboard Hot 100, making her the only soloist in history to debut five songs atop the chart, and became the best-selling song of 2022. It also topped the Billboard Global 200 and Radio Songs charts, with Swift becoming the first artist in history to score number-ones on the latter across the 2000s, 2010s and 2020s decades. A duet remix featuring American rock band Bleachers was released on November 7, 2022.

Background 
On August 28, 2022, Taylor Swift announced her tenth studio album, Midnights, set for release on October 21, 2022. The track-list was not immediately revealed. Jack Antonoff, a longtime collaborator of Swift who had worked with her since her fifth studio album 1989 (2014), was confirmed as a producer on Midnights by a video posted to Swift's Instagram account on September 16, 2022, titled "The making of Midnights". Beginning on September 21, 2022, Swift began unveiling the track-list in a randomized order through her short video series on TikTok, called Midnights Mayhem with Me. It consisted of 13 episodes, with one song revealed in every episode. Swift rolls a lottery cage containing 13 ping pong balls numbered from one to thirteen, each representing a track of Midnights, and when a ball drops out, she disclosed the title of the corresponding track on the album, through a telephone. In the sixth episode on October 3, 2022, Swift announced the title of the third track as "Anti-Hero".

Lyrics and composition 
Swift posted a video on Instagram, saying "Anti-Hero" is one of her favorite songs she has ever written. She said the song examines her mental insecurities in depth, detailing the things she hates about herself and her struggle with "not feeling like a person".

"Anti-Hero" is a pop rock and synth pop song with influences of 1980s rock. It is driven by a methodical drum loop and "simmering" synths. Its lyrics see Swift self-criticize, calling herself "the problem" and expressing her insecurities, anxiety, and depression. Themes addressed include ghosting acquaintances, camouflaging narcissism as altruism, fears of relationships being transactional, and Swift's inability to commingle with people normally due to her celebrity status. Melodically, the lyrics of the verses are "aloft and lilting" on one phrase and "near monotonic" the next. In the bridge, she describes one of her nightmares, in which Swift's daughter-in-law murders Swift to inherit her fortune. In the final chorus, Swift's vocals are characterized as "weary [...] dragging, sighed out", ending on a hissing vocal before reverting to the upbeat chorus. The lyrics also contain a reference to American sitcom series 30 Rock in the lyric "Sometimes I feel like everybody is a sexy baby, and I'm a monster on the hill", which has been interpreted as a response to fetishism of physical features of young women and "feminine youth". "Anti-Hero" is performed in the key of E major with a tempo of 97 beats per minute in common time, following the chord progression A–E–B–Cm, with Swift's vocals ranging from E3 to C5.

Release and promotion 
On October 16, Swift posted a short video on her social media accounts that depicted an itinerary of the events scheduled for the album launch, entitled Midnights Manifest. It specified a music video release for "Anti-Hero" the same day as the album. Excerpts from the video were shown in a teaser trailer for the album's visuals during Amazon Prime Video's broadcast of Thursday Night Football on October 20. Besides Swift, the names of the cast of the song's music video—Mike Birbiglia, John Early, and Mary Elizabeth Ellis—also appeared in the trailer. The schedule also mentioned a "#TSAntiHeroChallenge", an Internet challenge launched on October 21, right after the music video premiered, in collaboration with YouTube Shorts exclusively on the platform.

Universal Music Group sent "Anti-Hero" to Italian radio stations on October 21, 2022. The song was also released for digital download on Swift's website the same day. Republic Records released it to the US hot adult contemporary radio on October 24, and contemporary hit radio on October 25, as the lead single from Midnights.

On November 7, 2022, a duet remix of "Anti-Hero" featuring Antonoff's alternative rock band Bleachers was released for digital download exclusively on Swift's website, before becoming generally available for streaming and digital download the following day.

Critical reception 
"Anti-Hero" received universal acclaim from music critics. Exclaim! critic Megan LaPierre called it Swift's best lead-single choice "in ages". Olivia Horn of Pitchfork said the song confronts Swift's flaws and fallibility, and described it as a blend of "the lacquered synth-pop of 1989, the neurotic image analysis of Reputation, the dense lyricism of Folklore and Evermore." Brittany Spanos of Rolling Stone dubbed "Anti-Hero" an album standout, featuring a "Blank Space-level burn of both herself and her critics", and praised the "deliciously diabolical" bridge. Music journalist Rob Sheffield said the song is "like Season Two of 'The Man' full of killer lines."

Lauren Jackson of The New Yorker appreciated the song's peppy production, "irreverent" chorus, rhyme scheme, and Swift's vocal cadence. Lindsay Zoladz of The New York Times called it an "infectious, playfully self-flagellating" song and praised its comment on fetishizing young women. Chris Willman of Variety lauded the song's confessional lyrics, quirky mood, and "earworm" hook. He also wrote that Swift sounds "out of breath, as if she'd just had to rush through the door to make this random, bald admission" in the song's refrain, calling her "a master of tragicomic dramaturgy as a singer as well as a songwriter."

The Guardian critic Alexis Petridis stated "Anti-Hero" offers "a litany of small-hours self-loathing", but sensed "an appealing confidence" in Swift's approach—that she "no longer feels she has to compete on the same terms as her peers." Billboard journalist Jason Lipshutz ranked it as the best song on Midnights. He commended its "wondrously scathing self-examination", "sardonic masterstrokes", and Antonoff's "sleek, shiny" production. Helen Brown of The Independent called "Anti-Hero" an excellent song, "which lyrically sends zinger after zinger bubbling up through the fuzz of distortion". Brown praised the "terrific, surreal imagery" used to portray the "unwieldiness" of Swift's stardom.

The Observer critic Kitty Empire picked "Anti-Hero" as one of the most "fascinating" tracks of the album, because of its "darkest self-flagellation". Carl Wilson of Slate highlighted the lyrics, praising "the image of a touring superstar as an unrelatable monster" and Evermore-inspired "vignette" in the bridge about her future children. Wilson also admired Swift's "expanded" vocal tones, such as a "fantasy-European elevation reminiscent of Kate Bush" and "a very Yankee drawl". Calling "Anti-Hero" the "musical and emotional heart" of Midnights, Rick Quinn of PopMatters praised its "infectious" beat, "earworm" rhythm, Swift's enunciation, and Antonoff's production. He interpreted the "monster on a hill" lyric as Swift's "impossibility of blending in as one of America’s biggest cultural figures." John Murphy of MusicOMH regarded "Anti-Hero" as "a Taylor Swift classic in the making", naming it one of the best songs she has ever written. DIY said "Anti-Hero" is arguably Swift's best lead-single. GQ named "Anti-Hero" one of the best songs of 2022.

Music video 
The music video for "Anti-Hero", written and directed by Swift, premiered via her Vevo channel on YouTube at 08:00 Eastern Daylight Time (EDT) on October 21, eight hours after the song's and album's release.

Synopsis 
The video opens with Swift singing the first verse in a 1970s-style suburban home kitchen at night, briefly surrounded by ghosts in tablecloths. She opens the front door, revealing a second version of herself with her early-2010s appearance and a tour dance outfit, and they drink shots and sing the chorus together. The "current" version plays a blue guitar, while the "younger" version smashes a copy of it on the floor and criticizes the weight of the current version. A photograph of Swift's grandmother, Marjorie Finlay, is seen in the background during the bathroom scene. A third, giant version of Swift crawls into a neighbor's dinner party during the second verse, whereupon a guest unsuccessfully tries to subdue her by shooting her in the shoulder with a bow and arrow. The giant version of Swift gives a shocked and disbelieving look in response and glumly eats the guests' food alone.

The dialogue portion of the video plays out during the bridge, which describes Swift's dream of her own funeral, attended by her sons Preston and Chad (Mike Birbiglia and John Early) and daughter-in-law Kimber (Mary Elizabeth Ellis), the latter of whom Chad, who arrived from Ibiza, implicates in the apparent murder of Swift. The narrator Swift peeks from inside her elder self's coffin and eventually gets out without being noticed. The three attendees learn that Swift's last will and testament leaves them each with 13 cents and bequeaths her assets, including a beach house, to her cats Benjamin, Meredith and Olivia. Believing their mother left a secret encoded message, because "that's what mom would always do", a reference to Swift's "Easter eggs", her children keep reading but find out their inheritance is exactly as stated. This leads to bickering over who capitalized on Swift's name the most, in ways such as releasing a book and podcast or even wearing her old clothes. The ceremony ends in a brawl after Chad accuses Kimber of pushing Swift off a balcony to her death. The final scene of the video shows the first two versions of Swift sitting on the rooftop and offering a bottle of wine to the giant version, who happily accepts.

Reception 

The music video received generally positive reviews from critics. However, a brief scene in the video alluding to Swift's struggles with eating disorder received mixed reactions from some social media users, who accused Swift of fatphobia. The scene depicts a depressed Swift stepping on a bathroom scale, which reads "fat", making the other, happier Swift shake her head in disapproval. An op-ed from The Cut said the scene "reinforces the idea of being ‘fat’ as bad". Several other social media users defended Swift. Op-eds from publications such as The Guardian, The Independent and The Daily Telegraph, and television shows like The View also sided with Swift, arguing that context is important, and given her history with an eating disorder, she should not have to "sanitize" her psychological trauma to make her art "digestible" for audiences. They highlighted that the point of "Anti-Hero" and its video is to illustrate "the warped workings of her brain back when she was in the throes of an eating disorder".

Nevertheless, the video was later edited to remove the specific shot of the scale. The removal of the scene also sparked criticism. Maya Georgi of NBC News questioned why Swift has "once again, let criticism control her actions" and why "did she not stand by the critique she was making with this scene". Georgi also said that Swift was "boldly" demonstrating "the damage the rhetoric of valuing thinness and demonizing larger bodies has done to her", and that "it's not an easy thing to unlearn. I am still unlearning it. Thousands of people across the gender spectrum are still unlearning it." Tomás Mier of Rolling Stone wrote Swift "had to water down her artistic expression and how she chose to portray her lived experience" and concluded, "Simply put: It's not that [Swift] thinks being fat is a bad thing, but that she was made to believe that it was."

The casket in the funeral scene from the music video is a direct-to-consumer model purchased from a company called Titan Casket, based in Bellevue, Washington, and Andover, Massachusetts. It received online attention and experienced a "huge spike in sales", according to the company.

Commercial performance 
Upon the release of Midnights, "Anti-Hero" earned over 17.4 million plays in its first 24 hours on Spotify globally, becoming the biggest opening day for a song in the platform's history. The single debuted atop the Billboard Global 200 and Global Excl. US charts, marking Swift's second number-one song on both the charts since their inception in 2020.

In the United States, "Anti-Hero" debuted atop the Billboard Hot 100 as Swift's ninth number-one song in the country, with 59.7 million streams, 13,500 digital downloads sold, and an airplay audience of 32 million. Swift became the first artist to simultaneously occupy the top 10 spots of the Billboard Hot 100 chart; the first artist to debut atop the Hot 100 with solo songs five times; the female artist with the most top-10 entries (40), surpassing Madonna (38); the first artist to debut atop both the Billboard 200 and Hot 100 simultaneously as many as four times; and the first artist to occupy the entire top-ten of the Hot 100, Streaming Songs, and Digital Songs charts simultaneously. "Anti-Hero" also debuted at number 13 on the Radio Songs chart, a personal best for Swift, and eventually became her seventh number-one on the chart, making Swift the first artist to score a chart-topper in the 2000s, 2010s and 2020s decades separately. "Anti-Hero" topped the Pop Airplay chart for three non-consecutive weeks and became her 10th number one on the chart and her first since "Delicate" in 2018.

The single spent a total eight weeks at the top spot of the Billboard Hot 100, surpassing "Blank Space" (2014) as Swift's longest-running number-one song. It remained atop the Hot 100 for six consecutive weeks, paving way for Mariah Carey's "All I Want for Christmas Is You" (1994) to top the chart for the next four weeks during the holiday season, and returned to the top spot for two additional weeks in January 2023. "Anti-Hero" is the 10th song in Hot 100 history to spend its first six weeks at number one, and sold 327,000 digital downloads in its third week in the US, achieving the biggest week for any song since her own "Look What You Made Me Do" (2017) sold 353,000 in its first week. The song finished 2022 as the best-selling song of the year, with a total 436,000 digital downloads sold.

"Anti-Hero" topped the Canadian Hot 100 for five weeks, and marked her ninth number-one song in Canada. In Australia, "Anti-Hero" charted at number one on both the ARIA Singles and Airplay charts. It marked Swift's ninth number-one song in Australia. According to Universal Music Australia, "Anti-Hero" became the first song ever to debut atop the airplay chart. It has spent six consecutive weeks atop the singles chart, with its first five weeks alongside Midnights number-one run atop the albums chart—a record "Chart Double" streak. "Anti-Hero" debuted atop New Zealand's singles chart as well, and spent nine consecutive weeks atop the Billboard Philippines Songs chart.

"Anti-Hero" marked Swift's second number-one single in the UK after "Look What You Made Me Do"; both debuted atop the UK Singles Chart. Swift became the first woman since Miley Cyrus in 2013 (Bangerz and "Wrecking Ball") to simultaneously debut atop the albums and singles chart, following the number-one debut of Midnights as well. "Anti-Hero" spent six consecutive weeks atop the chart, surpassing "Look What You Made Me Do" to become her longest running number one on the chart, and spent 15 non-consecutive weeks in the top ten, surpassing "Shake It Off" to become her longest running top ten hit. It debuted atop the Irish Singles Chart, marking her third chart-topper in Ireland, and formed a Chart Double with Midnights debut atop the Irish Albums Chart. The song was number-one in Ireland for six consecutive weeks.

In Germany, "Anti-Hero" scored Swift her first top-ten song on the Top 100 Songs chart since "Look What You Made Me Do", debuting at number eight and later peaking at number seven. "Anti-Hero" charted at number one in Belgium and Latvia, for six and three non-consecutive weeks, respectively. It broke the all-time records for the most streams for a song by an international artist in a week and day on Spotify Brazil and Canada. It received a gold certification from Music Canada by within its first five days.

 Live performances 
Swift publicly performed "Anti-Hero" for the first time on January 12, 2023, as a surprise guest at the London show of English band the 1975's 2023 concert tour, At Their Very Best Tour. The song was part of the regular set list of the Eras Tour (2023).

 Accolades 

 Usage in media 

 A large portion of the song was used in the final episode of the fourth season of You, an American psychological thriller series on Netflix.
 The song was covered by British singer-songwriter Mimi Webb on BBC One's Live Lounge.

Track listingDigital download and streaming "Anti-Hero" – 3:21
 "Anti-Hero" (Illenium remix) – 4:27
 "Anti-Hero" (acoustic version) – 3:16Digital download "Anti-Hero" (instrumental) – 3:21
 "Anti-Hero" (Kungs remix extended version) – 3:55Digital download and streaming – Single "Anti-Hero" (featuring Bleachers) – 3:48
 "Anti-Hero" – 3:21Digital download and streaming – Remixes'''
 "Anti-Hero" (featuring Bleachers) – 3:48
 "Anti-Hero" (Roosevelt remix) – 4:59
 "Anti-Hero" (Kungs remix) – 3:14
 "Anti-Hero" (Jayda G remix) – 3:35
 "Anti-Hero" – 3:21

 Credits and personnel 
Credits are adapted from Pitchfork''.
Recording
 Recorded at Rough Customer Studio (Brooklyn) and Electric Lady Studios (New York City)
 Mixed at MixStar Studios (Virginia Beach)
 Mastered at Sterling Sound (Edgewater, New Jersey)
 Bobby Hawk's performance was recorded by Jon Gautier at Sound House Studios (Lakeland, Florida)

Personnel
 Taylor Swift – vocals, songwriter, producer
 Jack Antonoff – songwriter, producer, drums, programming, percussion, modular synths, Prophet-5, bass, acoustic guitars, Juno 6, Mellotron, Wurlitzer, background vocals, recording
 Bobby Hawk – violin
 Megan Searl – assistant engineer
 Jon Sher – assistant engineer
 John Rooney – assistant engineer
 Şerban Ghenea – mix engineer
 Bryce Bordone – assistant mix engineer
 Randy Merrill – mastering engineer
 Jon Gautier – recording
 Laura Sisk – recording

Charts

Weekly

Year-end

Certifications

|-
!colspan="3"|Streaming
|-

Release history

Footnotes

See also 

List of Billboard Digital Song Sales number ones of 2022
List of Billboard Digital Song Sales number ones of 2023
List of Billboard Global 200 number ones of 2022
List of Billboard Hot 100 number ones of 2022
List of Billboard Hot 100 number ones of 2023
List of Billboard Hot 100 top-ten singles in 2022
List of Billboard Streaming Songs number ones of 2022
List of Canadian Hot 100 number-one singles of 2022
List of number-one singles from the 2020s (New Zealand)
List of number-one singles of 2022 (Australia)
List of number-one singles of 2022 (Ireland)
List of number-one songs of 2022 (Malaysia)
List of number-one songs of 2022 (Singapore)
List of Ultratop 50 number-one singles of 2022
List of Ultratop 50 number-one singles of 2023
List of UK top-ten singles in 2022
List of UK Singles Chart number ones of 2022

References 

2022 singles
2022 songs
Taylor Swift songs
American pop rock songs
American synth-pop songs
Billboard Global 200 number-one singles
Billboard Global Excl. U.S. number-one singles
Billboard Hot 100 number-one singles
Bleachers (band) songs
Canadian Hot 100 number-one singles
Irish Singles Chart number-one singles
Music video controversies
Number-one singles in Australia
Number-one singles in New Zealand
Number-one singles in the Philippines
Number-one singles in Singapore
Republic Records singles
Self-censorship
Songs about anxiety
Songs about depression
Songs about mental health
Songs about nightmares
Songs written by Taylor Swift
Songs written by Jack Antonoff
Song recordings produced by Taylor Swift
Song recordings produced by Jack Antonoff
UK Singles Chart number-one singles
Ultratop 50 Singles (Flanders) number-one singles